Bob Hempel (born 9 November 1936) is a former Australian rules footballer who played with Footscray in the Victorian Football League (VFL).

After leaving Footscray, he played country football with Benalla, Euroa and Wangaratta Rovers, being selected in the Ovens & Murray League representative teams on several occasions.

Notes

External links 

Bob Hempel's playing statistics from The VFA Project

Living people
1936 births
Australian rules footballers from Victoria (Australia)
Yarraville Football Club players
Western Bulldogs players